Seyyed Ali Shahidi (also Romanized as Seyyed ʿAlī Shahīdī; also known as Seyyedallī) is a village in Soghan Rural District, Soghan District, Arzuiyeh County, Kerman Province, Iran. At the 2006 census, its population was 171, in 32 families.

References 

Populated places in Arzuiyeh County